The given name Julien may refer to:
 Julien Absalon (born 1980), a French cross-country mountain biker
 Julien Alvard (1916–1974), a French art critic
 Julien Anfruns (living), a French Director General of the International Council of Museums since 2008
 Julien Aklei (born 1975), an American singer-songwriter, guitarist and artist
 Julien Arias (born 1983), a French rugby union player
 Julien Aubert (born 1978), French politician
 Julien Bahain (born 1986), a French rower
 Julien Bailleul (1988–2011), a French football player
 Julien Baker (born 1995), an American singer, songwriter, and guitarist
 Julien Balbo (born 1979), a French professional squash player
 Julien Balkany (born 1981), a French businessman
 Julien Bardy (born 1985), a French-born Portuguese rugby union player
 Julien Baudet (born 1979), a French former football player and current manager
 Julien Belgy (born 1983), a French professional road bicycle racer
 Julien Benda (1867–1956), a French philosopher and novelist
 Julien Benneteau (born 1981), a French professional tennis player
 Julien Bérard (born 1987), a French professional road bicycle racer
 Julien Berger (born 1990), a Belgian rugby union player
 Julien Bertheau (1910–1995), a French actor
 Julien Berthier, a French artist
 Julien Berthomier (born 1990), a French football player
 Julien Bessières (1777–1840), a French scientist
 Julien Billaut (born 1981), a French slalom canoer
 Julien Binford (1909–1997), an American painter
 Julien Boisselier (born 1970), a French actor
 Julien Bonnaire (born 1978), a French rugby union player
 Julien Bontemps (born 1979), a French sailor
 Julien Boutter (born 1974), a French former professional tennis player
 Julien Brellier (born 1982), a French football player
 Julien Brouillette (born 1986), a Canadian professional ice hockey player
 Julien Brugnaut (born 1981), a rugby union player
 Julien Brulé (1875-after 1920), a French archer who competed in the 1920 Summer Olympics
 Julien Bryan (1899–1974), an American photographer and film maker
 Julien Cahn (1882–1944), an entrepreneur and philanthropist
 Julien Cain (1887–1974), the general administrator of the Bibliothèque nationale de France before the Occupation of France by Nazi Germany
 Julien Canal (born 1982), a French racing driver
 Julien Candelon (born 1980), a French professional rugby player
 Julien Cardy (born 1981), a French football player
 Julien Carette (1897–1966), a French film actor
 Julien Cartron (born 1989), a French Grand Prix motorcycle racer
 Julien Casoli (born 1982), a French Paralympian athlete
 Julien Cétout (born 1988), a French professional football player
 Julien Chaisse (born 1976), professor of law at the City University of Hong Kong
 Julien Chouinard (1929–1987), a Canadian lawyer and civil servant
 Julien Civange (living), a French musician, composer, lyricist and producer
 Julien Clerc (born 1947), a French singer
 Julien Cools (born 1947), a Belgian football player
 Julien Cordonnier (born 1980), a French professional football player
 Julien Cosmao (1761–1825), a French Navy officer and admiral
 Julien Coupat (born 1974), a French political activist
 Julien Courbey (born 1976), a French actor
 Julien Cousineau (born 1981), a Canadian alpine skier
 Julien Darui (1916–1987), a French football player
 Julién Davenport (born 1995), American football player
 Julien Davies Cornell (1910–1994), an American lawyer
 Julien de Lallande Poydras (1746–1824), a French-American politician
 Julien Delonglée (born 1983), a French professional football player
 Julien De Smedt (born 1975), a Belgian-Danish architect
 Julien Desprès (born 1983), a French rower
 Julien Desrosiers (born 1980), an ice hockey player
 Julien De Wilde (born 1944), a Belgian businessman
 Julien Dillens (1849–1904), a Belgian sculptor
 Julien Doré (born 1982), a French singer
 Julien Dray (born 1955), a member of the National Assembly of France
 Julien Dubuque (1762–1810), a French Canadian settler
 Julien Dunkley (born 1975), a Jamaican track and field athlete
 Julien Dupré (1851–1910), a French painter
 Julien Dupuy (born 1983), a French rugby union player
 Julien Durand (footballer) (born 1983), French association footballer
 Julien Durand (politician) (1874–1973), French politician
 Julien Duvivier (1896–1967), French film director
 Julien El Fares (born 1985), French road bicycle racer
 Julien Escudé (born 1979), French football player
 Julien Falk (1902–1987), French composer
 Julien Faubert (born 1983), French football player
 Julien Faussurier (born 1987), French football player
 Julien Favier (born 1980), French professional football player
 Julien Félix, French early aviator
 Julien Féret (born 1982), a French football player
 Julien Fernandes (born 1985), a French-Portuguese football player
 Julien Fivaz (born 1979), a Swiss long jumper
 Julien Forêt (born 1982), a French professional golfer
 Julien Fountain (born 1970), an English professional cricket coach
 Julien Fournié (living), a French fashion designer
 Julien François (born 1979), a French football player
 Julien Friedler (1950–2022), a Belgian writer and contemporary artist
 Julien Frier (born 1974), a French rugby union player
 Julien Garnier (1642–1730), a French Jesuit missionary to Canada
 Julien Gerbi (born 1985), a French-Algerian race car driver
 Julien Gibert (disambiguation)
 Julien Girard (born 1984), a French professional football player
 Julien Gorius (born 1985), a French football player
 Julien Gouyet, a French priest credited with discovering the House of the Virgin Mary in  1881
 Julien Gracq (1910–2007), a French writer
 Julien Green (1900–1998), an American writer
 Julien Guadet (1834–1908), a French architect
 Julien Guerrier (born 1985), a French professional golfer
 Julien Guertiau (1885–1954), a French flying ace during World War I
 Julien Guiomar (1928–2010), a French film director
 Julien Havet (1853–1893), a French historian
 Julien Hébert (1917–1994), a Québécois industrial designer
 Julien Hoffman (born 1925), a South African-American pediatric cardiologist
 Julien Hoffmann (1924–2007), a Luxembourgian composer and professor of music
 Julien Hornuss (born 1986), a French football player
 Julien Hudson (1811–1844), a free man of color who lived in New Orleans, United States
 Julien Humbert (born 1984), a French football player
 Julien Ictoi (born 1978), a French football player
 Julien Ielsch (born 1983), a French professional football player
 Julien Ingrassia (born 1979), a French rally co-driver
 Julien Jeanpierre (born 1980), a French former professional tennis player
 Julien Josephson (1881–1959), an American motion picture screenwriter
 Julien Jousse (born 1986), a French professional racing driver
 Julien Kapek (born 1979), a French triple jumper
 Julien Kerneur (born 1991), a French professional kite surfer
 Julien Klener (born 1939), a Belgian linguist
 Julien Lachuer (born 1976), a French football player
 Julien Laharrague (born 1978), a French rugby union player
 Julien Lahaut (1884–1950), a Belgian politician
 Julien Laubscher (born 1987), a South African pop artist
 Julien Le Blant (1851–1936), a French painter of military subjects
 Julien J. LeBourgeois (1923–2012), a retired vice admiral of the United States Navy
 Julien Leclercq (1865–1901), a French poet and art critic
 Julien Leparoux (born 1983), a Champion jockey
 Julien Lepers (born 1949), a French television and radio host
 Julien Le Roy (1686–1759), a Parisian clockmaker and watchmaker
 Julien Levy (1906–1981), an art dealer in New York City, United States
 Julien Lizeroux (born 1979), a French World Cup alpine ski racer
 Julien Lootens (1876–1942), a Belgian cyclist
 Julien Loubet (born 1985), a French professional road bicycle racer
 Julien Lorcy (born 1972), a professional boxer
 Julien Loriot (1633–1715), a French theologian
 Julien Lorthioir (born 1983), a French professional football player
 Julien Lourau (born 1970), a French jazz saxophonist
 Julien Lowe, a fictional character in the television drama series The Shield
 Julien Loy (born 1976), a French triathlete
 Julien Lutz (born 1975), a Canadian music video director
 Julien Macdonald (born 1971), a Welsh fashion designer
 Julien Magnat (living), a French film and television screenwriter and director
 Julien Maitron (1881–1972), a French professional road bicycle racer
 Julien Malzieu (born 1983), a French rugby union and sevens player
 Julien Martinelli (born 1980), a French football player
 Julien Maurin (living), a French rally driver
 Julien Maury (born 1978), a French filmmaker
 Julien Mayfair, a fictional character in Anne Rice 's Mayfair Witches trilogy
 Julien Mazet (born 1981), a French professional road bicycle racer
 Julien Médecin (1894-?), a Monegasque architect
 Julien Moineau (1903–1980), a French professional road bicycle racer
 Julien Mory Sidibé (1927–2003), a bishop of Mali
 Julien Musafia, an American musicologist
 Julien N'Da (born 1985), an Ivorian football player
 Julien Nitzberg (born 1966), an American film director, script writer and theatre director
 Julien Offray de La Mettrie (1709–1751), a French physician and philosopher
 Julien of Toulouse (1750–1828), a French deputy to the National Convention
 Julien Outrebon (born 1983), a French professional football player
 Julien Paluku Kahongya (born 1968), a politician of the Democratic Republic of the Congo
 Julien Peridier (1882–1967), a French electrical engineer and amateur astronomer
 Julien Perrichon (1566 – c. 1600), a French composer and lutenist of the late Renaissance
 Julien Perrin (born 1985), a French professional football player
 Julien Peyrelongue (born 1981), a French rugby union player
 Julien Pierre (born 1981), a French rugby union player
 Julien Pillet (born 1977), a French sabre fencer
 Julien Poueys (born 1979), a French football player
 Julien Poulin (born 1946), a Canadian actor, film director, screenwriter, film producer and composer
 Julien Prosser (born 1972), an Australian beach volleyball player
 Julien Puricelli (born 1981), a French rugby union player
 Julien Quercia (born 1986), a French football player
 Julien Quesne (born 1980), a French professional golfer
 Julien Raimond (1744–1801), an indigo planter in the French colony of Saint-Domingue
 Julien Rantier (born 1983), a French football player
 Julien Rassam (1968–2002), a French actor
 Julien Reverchon (1837–1905), a French botanist
 Julien Ries (1920–2013), a Belgian religious historian
 Julien Rinaldi (born 1979), a French rugby league player
 Julien Robert (born 1974), a French biathlete
 Julien Rodriguez (born 1978), a French professional football player
 Julien Sablé (born 1980), a French football player
 Julien Saubade (born 1983), a French rugby union player
 Julien Schepens (1935–2006), a Belgian former professional road bicycle racer
 Julien Senderos (born 1980), a Swiss basketball player
 Julien Simon (born 1985), a French road bicycle racer
 Julien Sicot (born 1978), a French Olympic freestyle swimmer
 Julien Sola (born 1984), a French professional football player
 Julien Sprunger (born 1986), a Swiss professional ice hockey player
 Julien Stevens (born 1943), a Belgian retired cyclist
 Julien Temple (born 1952), an English film, documentary and music video director
 Julien Tiersot (1857–1936), a French musicologist and composer
 Julien Tomas (born 1985), a French rugby union player
 Julien Torma (1902–1933), a French writer, playwright and poet
 Julien Toudic (born 1985), a French football player
 Julien Tournut (born 1982), a French football player
 Julien Touxagas (born 1984), a professional rugby league footballer
 Julien Valero (born 1984), a French-Spanish football player
 Julien Vanzeebroeck (born 1946), a Belgian Grand Prix motorcycle road racer
 Julien Varlet (born 1977), a French former professional tennis player
 Julien Vauclair (born 1979), a Swiss professional ice hockey player
 Julien Viale (born 1982), a French football player
 Julien Viaud (1850–1923), a French novelist and naval officer
 Julien Vidot (born 1982), a French racing driver
 Julien Vermote (born 1989), a Belgian professional cyclist
 Julien Vervaecke (1899–1940), a Belgian professional road bicycle racer
 Julien Wartelle (1889–1943), a French gymnast
 Julien Wiener (born 1955), an Australian former cricket player
 King Julien, a character in Madagascar

and also:
 Julien Augustin Joseph Mermet (1772–1837), a French general who fought in the Napoleonic Wars
 Julien-Désiré Schmaltz (1771–1826), a French colonial administrator
 Julien Edmund Victor Gaujot (1874–1938), an American Army Medal of Honor recipient
 Julien François Desjardins (1799–1840), a French zoologist
 Julien Joseph Vesque (1848–1895), a French naturalist
 Julien Léon Loizillon (1829–1899), a French general
 Julien Louis Geoffroy (1743–1814), a French literary critic
 Julien Noël Costantin (1857–1936), a French botanist and mycologist
 Julien Paul Blitz (1885–1951), an American cellist, conductor and teacher
 Algirdas Julien Greimas (1917–1992), a French semiotician
 André Julien Chainat (1892–1961), a French World War I flying ace
 Charles Julien Brianchon (1783–1864), a French mathematician and chemist
 Gabriel-Julien Ouvrard (1770–1846), a French financier
 Jean Baptiste Julien d'Omalius d'Halloy (1783–1875), a Belgian geologist
 Louis Julien Demers (1848–1905), a merchant and political figure in Quebec
 Luc-Julien-Joseph Casabianca (1762–1798), a French Navy officer
 Maxime Julien Émeriau de Beauverger (1762–1845), a French Navy officer and admiral

See also 
 Julie (given name)
 Jean-Julien (given name)
 Julien-Joseph (given name)
 Pierre-Julien (given name)

Given names
Masculine given names
French masculine given names
English masculine given names